A refresher, in English legal phraseology, is an additional fee paid to counsel in a prolonged case.

The fee applies when a case on trial is adjourned from one term or sitting to another, or when a term extends over more than one day (if the first or subsequent day(s) occupy more than five hours without being concluded).

References 
 Fees & Funding, Hardwicke legal services.

English law
English legal terminology